Langston Hasan Love (born April 21, 2002) is an American college basketball player for the Baylor Bears of the Big 12 Conference.

High school career
Love began his high school career at Steele High School in Cibolo, Texas. He averaged 23.1 points, 7.8 rebounds and 1.5 steals per game as a sophomore. Following his sophomore season, Love transferred to Montverde Academy and played alongside Cade Cunningham, Scottie Barnes, Moses Moody, Day'Ron Sharpe and Caleb Houstan. As a junior, he scored 18 points against McEachern High School during the Hoophall Classic. Love helped Montverde to a GEICO National title as a senior, contributing 13 points, seven rebounds and five assists in a 62–52 win against Sunrise Christian Academy. Love was named to the roster of the Jordan Brand Classic.

Recruiting
Love was a consensus four-star recruit and one of the top shooting guards in the 2021 class. On July 15, 2020, he committed to playing college basketball for Baylor, the first school to offer him a scholarship. He chose the Bears over offers from Stanford, Texas, UCLA, Kansas, Arkansas, Villanova, Illinois, Texas Tech, Texas A&M and Oklahoma State. Love became the highest-rated Baylor signee since Isaiah Austin committed in 2012, and the fourth-highest ranked prospect in program history.

College career
On October 5, 2021, It was announced that Love had torn his ACL in a scrimmage and would miss the season.

Personal life
Love's father Kevin Love was a standout football player at Judson High School.Mother is Ondrea Love. He has 3 sisters, Endaisia, Camille and Sidney Love who all played collegiate sports. Also has an older brother Kijana, who played collegiately at New Hampshire.

References

External links
Baylor Bears bio
Montverde Academy Eagles bio
USA Basketball bio

2002 births
Living people
American men's basketball players
Basketball players from Texas
Baylor Bears men's basketball players
Montverde Academy alumni
People from Cibolo, Texas
Shooting guards